Album Minus Band is the debut full-length album from DIY collective Bomb the Music Industry! It was recorded by ex-Arrogant Sons of Bitches frontman, Jeff Rosenstock, in a bedroom. The album contains “Unlicensed cover songs. Unlicensed audio samples. Great times.”  It is available for free download on the band's website, as well as on Quote Unquote Records’ website. The title of this record would go on to inspire the name of a fan-sourced tribute album entitled "Album Minus Jeff". It was released on vinyl for the first time in 2008 through Asbestos Records.

In a 2015 interview Rosenstock said "This record was kind of terrifying to make, but it was also really honest. It's a really fucked up sounding, pure record from someone who doesn’t know how to use a thing, recording-wise. It got me out of whatever shitty path I was on had I not done this." Rosenstock continued: "I think this record is the spirit of the whole Bomb the Music Industry! thing. If you can't afford something, or there's a bunch of shit in your way, fuck it! Just make a record anyway. Just write songs and do your thing. There's not a record that encapsulates that more than this one."

Track listing
All songs written by Jeff Rosenstock except where noted.

Details

“Future 86” contains back-up vocals by The Know How and a group of about 100 fans. It was originally written for singer/guitarist Jeff Rosenstock's previous band, The Arrogant Sons of Bitches.

“Big Plans of Sleeping In” contains a sample from the film Shaun of the Dead.

“Sweet Home Cananada” was recorded using only the built in microphone on Rosenstock's computer. It uses “no electric guitars or bass... just distorted acoustic guitars”. It also contains a sample from comedian David Cross’s album, Shut Up You Fucking Baby.

“Funcoland vs. The Southern Electorate” was covered by Rick Johnson Rock and Roll Machine for the President's Day Split.

“I’m Too Cooooool for Music” contains a sample from the TV show Arrested Development.

References

External links
Album Minus Band on Quote Unquote Records

Bomb the Music Industry! albums
2005 albums
Albums free for download by copyright owner